Andrew Reed (born December 19, 1991) is an American rower. He competed in the 2020 Summer Olympics.

References

External links
 Harvard Crimson bio

1991 births
Living people
American male rowers
Olympic rowers of the United States
Rowers at the 2020 Summer Olympics
World Rowing Championships medalists for the United States
Harvard Crimson rowers
Sportspeople from Worcester, Massachusetts
21st-century American people